Desert View Highlands is a census-designated place (CDP) in Los Angeles County, California, United States. The population was 2,360 at the 2010 census, up from 2,337 at the 2000 census. It is surrounded by the City of Palmdale.

Geography

Demographics

2010
At the 2010 census Desert View Highlands had a population of 2,360. The racial makeup of Desert View Highlands was 1,286 (54.5%) White (33.3% Non-Hispanic White), 182 (7.7%) African American, 29 (1.2%) Native American, 50 (2.1%) Asian, 1 (0.0%) Pacific Islander, 669 (28.3%) from other races, and 143 (6.1%) from two or more races. Hispanic or Latino of any race were 1,253 persons (53.1%).

The census reported that 2,353 people (99.7% of the population) lived in households, 7 (0.3%) lived in non-institutionalized group quarters, and no one was institutionalized.

There were 678 households, 350 (51.6%) had children under the age of 18 living in them, 342 (50.4%) were opposite-sex married couples living together, 135 (19.9%) had a female householder with no husband present, 57 (8.4%) had a male householder with no wife present.  There were 55 (8.1%) unmarried opposite-sex partnerships, and 5 (0.7%) same-sex married couples or partnerships. 109 households (16.1%) were one person and 37 (5.5%) had someone living alone who was 65 or older. The average household size was 3.47.  There were 534 families (78.8% of households); the average family size was 3.82.

The age distribution was 746 people (31.6%) under the age of 18, 271 people (11.5%) aged 18 to 24, 590 people (25.0%) aged 25 to 44, 548 people (23.2%) aged 45 to 64, and 205 people (8.7%) who were 65 or older.  The median age was 31.1 years. For every 100 females, there were 99.2 males.  For every 100 females age 18 and over, there were 94.7 males.

There were 764 housing units at an average density of 1,736.5 per square mile, of the occupied units 443 (65.3%) were owner-occupied and 235 (34.7%) were rented. The homeowner vacancy rate was 4.1%; the rental vacancy rate was 10.3%.  1,417 people (60.0% of the population) lived in owner-occupied housing units and 936 people (39.7%) lived in rental housing units.

According to the 2010 United States Census, Desert View Highlands had a median household income of $63,717, with 22.1% of the population living below the federal poverty line.

2000
At the 2000 census there were 2,337 people, 731 households, and 565 families in the CDP. The population density was 4,950.4 inhabitants per square mile (1,919.8/km). The racial makeup of the CDP was 63.12% White, 5.86% Black or African American, 1.50% Native American, 2.23% Asian, 0.09% Pacific Islander, 19.77% from other races, and 7.45% from two or more races.  36.80% of the population were Hispanic or Latino of any race.
Of the 731 households 43.9% had children under the age of 18 living with them, 55.5% were married couples living together, 15.6% had a female householder with no husband present, and 22.7% were non-families. 19.2% of households were one person and 7.4% were one person aged 65 or older.  The average household size was 3.20 and the average family size was 3.66.

The age distribution was 35.1% under the age of 18, 7.5% from 18 to 24, 28.0% from 25 to 44, 20.0% from 45 to 64, and 9.4% 65 or older.  The median age was 33 years. For every 100 females, there were 96.2 males.  For every 100 females age 18 and over, there were 95.5 males.

The median household income was $37,341 and the median family income  was $40,263. Males had a median income of $38,413 versus $26,295 for females. The per capita income for the CDP was $15,651.  About 9.4% of families and 10.1% of the population were below the poverty line, including 10.5% of those under age 18 and 2.7% of those age 65 or over.

Government

References

Geography of Palmdale, California
Census-designated places in Los Angeles County, California
Populated places in the Mojave Desert
Census-designated places in California